Dimitar Iliev (Bulgarian: Димитър Илиев; born 22 July 1999) is a Bulgarian footballer who plays as a defender for Ludogorets Razgrad II.

Youth career
Dimitar Iliev began playing football in the local team of Lokomotiv (GO). Later Iliev joined the youth academy of Litex (Lovech). He won the BFU cup two times. In 2016 Iliev joined the youth team of Ludogorets (Razgrad). He won the Bulgarian championship twice and he has got one BFU cup. Iliev has made many appearances for Ludogorets in the UEFA Youth League’s group stage.

Career

Ludogorets Razgrad
Iliev made his professional debut for the first team on 20 May 2018 in a league match against Botev Plovdiv, coming as a substitute of Lachezar Kovachev after he got injured in the 64th minute. Iliev played mainly for the second team of Ludogorets and he made 6 assistances before he left the club.

CSKA 1948
In 2021 Iliev joined CSKA 1948. He made his debut for the team against CSKA Sofia. Iliev played also for the second team and scored a goal against Neftochimic.

Botev Vratsa
At the end of 2021 Iliev signed with Botev Vratsa. After finding it difficult to establish himself as part of the first team, on 1 May 2022, it was confirmed that he had left by mutual consent.

Return to Ludogorets
In 2022 Iliev returned to Ludogorets. He is mainly  playing for the second team. In the second round of the Bulgarian Cup, Iliev scored his debut goal for the fist team on 18 November 2022 against Rozova Dolina Kazanlak.

Career statistics

Club

References

External links
 

1999 births
Living people
Bulgarian footballers
Bulgaria youth international footballers
PFC Ludogorets Razgrad II players
PFC Ludogorets Razgrad players
First Professional Football League (Bulgaria) players
Second Professional Football League (Bulgaria) players
Association football defenders
People from Gorna Oryahovitsa
Sportspeople from Veliko Tarnovo Province